Angelika is a variant of Angelica, derived from Latin angelicus meaning "angelic", ultimately related to Greek ἄγγελος (ángelos) – "messenger". The poets Boiardo and Ariosto used this name in their 'Orlando' poems (1495 and 1532), where it belongs to Orlando's love interest. It has been used as a given name since the 18th century. Angelika is used in Polish, German, Slovak and Czech. Notable people with the name include:

Angelika Amon, Ph.D. (1967–2020), Austrian American molecular and cell biologist, professor at MIT
Angelika Bachmann (born 1979), professional German tennis player
Angelika Bahmann (born 1952), East German slalom canoeist who competed in the 1970s
Angelika Beer (born 1957), German politician
Angelika Brunkhorst (born 1955), German politician and member of the FDP
Angelika Buck (born 1950), German figure skater
Angelika Bunse-Gerstner, German mathematician
Angelika Dünhaupt (born 1946), West German luger
Angelika de la Cruz (born 1981), Filipina actress and singer
Angelika Handt (born 1954), retired East German sprinter who specialized in the 400 metres
Angelika Hurwicz (1922–1999), German actress and theatre director
Anna Maria Angelika Jansson (born 1958), Swedish crime writer and nurse from Gotland
Angelika Kallio (born 1972), Latvian-born Finnish model
Angelika Keilig-Hellmann (born 1954), German gymnast
Angelika Kirchschlager (born 1966), Austrian mezzo-soprano opera and lieder singer
Angelika Kirkhmaier, former Soviet ice dancer
Angelika Kluk (1983–2006), Polish-born crime victim
Angelika Knipping (born 1961), retired female breaststroke swimmer from Germany
Angelika Kratzer, semanticist whose expertise includes modals, situation semantics, and the syntax-semantics interface
Angelika Machinek (1956–2006), German glider pilot
Angelika Muharukua (born 1958), Namibian politician
Angelika Neuner (born 1969), Austrian luger who competed from 1987 to 2002
Angelika Niebler (born 1963), German politician and MEP for Bavaria
Angelika Noack (born 1950), German rower
Angelika Overath (born 1957), German author and journalist
Angelika Raubal (1908–1931), Adolf Hitler's half-niece
Angelika Schafferer (born 1960), Austrian luger who competed during the late 1970s and early 1980s
Angelika Speitel (born 1952), former member of the West German terrorist Red Army Faction
Angelika Tagwerker (fl. 1990s), Austrian luger who competed in the early 1990s
Angelika Volquartz (born 1946), the mayor of Kiel, Germany
Anzhelika Valerievna (born 1978), fashion designer, Belarus
Angelika Volquartz (born 1946), the mayor of Kiel, Germany
Anzhelika Savrayuk (born 1989), Ukrainian-Italian rhythmic gymnast

See also 
Angelica (given name)

References

German feminine given names
Polish feminine given names
Russian feminine given names
Czech feminine given names
Ukrainian feminine given names
Slovak feminine given names

is:Angelíka
hu:Angelika